Edward F. Shea (born 1942) is a senior United States district judge of the United States District Court for the Eastern District of Washington.

Education and career

Born in Malden, Massachusetts, Shea received a Bachelor of Science in Education degree from Boston State College in 1965 and a Juris Doctor from Georgetown University Law Center in 1970. Shea was a law clerk to Judge Harold Petrie of the Washington State Court of Appeals, Division II from 1970 to 1971. He was in private practice from 1971 to 1998.

Federal judicial service

Shea is a United States District Judge of the United States District Court for the Eastern District of Washington. Shea was nominated by President Bill Clinton on September 4, 1997, to a seat vacated by Alan Angus McDonald. He was confirmed by the United States Senate on March 27, 1998, and received his commission on April 8, 1998. Shea assumed senior status on June 7, 2012.

Sources

1942 births
Living people
Judges of the United States District Court for the Eastern District of Washington
United States district court judges appointed by Bill Clinton
University of Massachusetts Boston alumni
Georgetown University Law Center alumni
Boston State College alumni
People from Malden, Massachusetts
20th-century American judges
21st-century American judges